"Sun Come Up" is a song by American rapper Glasses Malone, released as the third single from his third studio album, Beach Cruiser. The track is produced by Bigg D and features Birdman, T-Pain, and Rick Ross. It is a hip hop song that samples Freddie Jackson's "Have You Ever Loved Somebody". On Beach Cruiser, the song is listed under the title "Til da Sun Come Up".

Music video
A music video was shot and released on June 5, 2009. The video was filmed on Miami Beach and was directed by Josh Logue.

Charts

References

2009 singles
Glasses Malone songs
Rick Ross songs
T-Pain songs
Birdman (rapper) songs
Cash Money Records singles
Songs written by Rick Ross
Songs written by T-Pain
2009 songs
Universal Motown Records singles
Songs written by Birdman (rapper)